Shelving, Inc. is a specialty retailer of shelving, racking, and storage products.  The company was founded in 1960 by industrial engineer Jack Schodowski in Detroit, Michigan, and is currently being run by his sons and son-in-law.

History 
Shelving, Inc. opened in a warehouse on Riopelle Street near downtown Detroit, Michigan, providing storage solutions for offices, warehouses, restaurants, retail stores, and more.  As the business expanded and needed more space, it moved to larger facilities in west Detroit and eventually settled in a  building located in Auburn Hills, Michigan.

After 40 years of running the business, Jack retired and sold his interests in the company to three of his sons, John, Mike, and Joe and son-in-law, Jim Aiello. The four brothers ran the company together for close to 20 years. After significant growth and change, Mike and Jim continue to lead the company as President and Vice President respectively. 

After the second generation took over the management of the company, they launched Shelving.com in 2000 and began selling products online in 2002. In 2007, the new owners launched TheShelvingStore.com, a separate B2C e-commerce site for home shelving and storage products. The growth of both stores earned Shelving, Inc. a position on the Michigan 50 Companies to Watch list in 2011. Most recently, the company launched Shelving Elite, a member's only site where companies can shop for their packaging, shipping, and handling supplies in one place. 

Today, Shelving, Inc. remains a family-owned and operated company, maintaining two locations in Michigan.  It is headquartered in Madison Heights, Mi.

Partnerships 
Shelving, Inc. partnered with the Capuchin Soup Kitchen, a Detroit-based nonprofit, in 1993 and continues to donate 10% of its profits to the organization every year.  The company also sponsored the Believe to Achieve Free Youth Football Camp, an annual camp for kids held in Warren, Michigan.

See also

References 

Companies based in Oakland County, Michigan